Honorary society may refer to:
 honor society 
 professional association
 learned society

See also
Honorary (disambiguation)